Typical Cats is an American underground hip hop group from Chicago, Illinois. The group consists of MCs Denizen Kane, Qwazaar and Qwel, and producers / DJs Kid Knish and DJ Natural. They have released three albums to date. Their song "Any Day" from their self-titled debut was featured in the video game Tony Hawk's Project 8.

Discography
Albums
 Typical Cats (2001)
 Civil Service (2004)
 3 (2012)

Compilations
 Typical Bootlegs Volume 1 (2004)

Singles
 "Easy Cause It Is" (2004)

References

External links
Typical Cats at Galapagos4.com
Typical Cats on Facebook
Typical Cats on Discogs

American hip hop groups
Musical groups from Chicago
Musical groups established in 2000
Midwest hip hop groups